Australian rules football in Papua New Guinea (PNG) (typically referred to as "Rules", "Rules football", or less commonly "Aussie Rules", "AFL rules", "AFL",  or "football") is a developing team sport which was initially introduced by Australian servicemen during World War II. The governing body for the sport is the PNG Rules Football Council, with the development body being AFL PNG. The junior development version is known locally as Niukick. Regionally, AFL PNG is affiliated with AFL Oceania.

Prior to independence from Australia the sport boomed in the 1960s and 70s, Rules was a major spectator and participation sport and the standard of representatives sides from PNG reached a level close to that of the semi-professional leagues in Australia. PNG proved to be highly competitive against VFL clubs and internationally against Australia, Indigenous Australia and Nauru. The national team's first full international match against Nauru attracted 10,000 to Sir Hubert Murray Stadium in Port Moresby which remains the world record for an international representative match in the sport. This golden age ended abruptly in 1981 after a failed restructuring of football operations by Australian interests, poor junior performance in the Teal Cup and the withdrawal of funding causing a total collapse of the sport. This resulted in other codes of football particularly League and soccer rapidly outgrowing it. Nevertheless, Rules has seen a major revival since the 1990s.

The Papua New Guinea national Australian rules football team is the most decorated in international Australian Football, having won more International titles (3 - 2008, 2014, 2017) than any other nation, in addition, it has won silver medals in 2002, 2005, 2011 and three gold at the Arafura Games. The PNG Muruks, a Papua New Guinea AFL Asia affiliated club has won the Asian Australian Football Championships in its respective divisions every year since 2018.

Players of Papua New Guinean heritage have played professionally in the Australian Football League, the most famous of which is "king" Mal Michael who holds the AFL games and goals record for a Papuan born player. More recently, a pathway from AFL PNG to the AFL, mainly through Queensland has been established. PNG has been successful in amateur competition and provides a source of talent for clubs in Australia. The pathway resulted in Hewago Oea, in 2022, becoming the first Papuan to debut in the AFL who learned to play the game locally.

In the media, the sport is covered by The National and Papua New Guinea Post-Courier and EMTV.

History

Early Beginnings

There was awareness of the sport early in the 20th Century, with mentions of it in the media dating back to the 1920s, including reports on the QAFL, NSWAFL, NTFL and VFL from the 1940s however it was not played locally.

In May 1943, serving in the Territory of Papua during the New Guinea campaign began an informal league which were among the earliest recorded matches in Papua New Guinea. The league consisted of teams including Konedobu, Wirraways, Razorback, Strafers, Wallabies, Pioneers, Bower Birds, Ack-Redians, John's Gully. On 29 April 1943, an RAAF team held a secret training session. Its first match was held that weekend on the 1st May. Another higher profile match was held on the 5 May 1943 featuring several notable Australian players. On Saturday 22 May 1943, RAAF Wirraways 13-10 defeated Razorback 9–8. On the 30 May 1943, John's Gully R.A.A.F. Australian Rules football team against a Waigani Road team at the
Gully Oval, the R.A.A.F. Wirraway Australian Rules football team also called for opponents. Other teams included Regiment and Con. Depot.

In the Territory of New Guinea, one of the earliest recorded matches was held in the capital Lae and the inland town of Nagada in 1944 by Australian school teachers and defence force personnel.

In November 1945, a match was played between Victoria and "The Rest" at Torokina, Bougainville.

A competition was played in Rabaul, New Britain in 1946 between servicemen, including the 29/46th infantry battalion, who played several matches against sides from New Guinea and New Britain. The HMAS Arunta Australian rules football team also played matches on Rabaul against Flotilla.

In 1956, Papua's first representative side was assembled, defeating regional representative sides from both Cairns and Innisfail in Far North Queensland.

1960s: Rules Booms
The game was seldom played until the earliest recorded match in Papua between Australians at Boroko Rugby League Oval, Port Moresby, 24 September 1961. Matches were also played in Lae. Rules was a relatively new sport in Papua, where rugby league had a significant head start. However, there were numerous Victorians, including many from the Warrnambool district working in Moresby at the time, enough to kickstart an 8 team competition.

The Cleland Medal was first awarded to the league's player. The 1964 winner was local grown player Herea Amini who was rewarded with a flight to Melbourne to play for 2 weeks with the VFL's Demons. Amini returned from Melbourne to found the Koboni Football Club, adopting the colours and moniker of the Melbourne Football Club in 1965, and Koboni Demons remain Papua New Guinea's longest running club.

There was an annual football carnival between Papua, New Guinea and the New Guinea Islands. In 1967 it was held in Rabaul and in 1968 it was hosted by Lae. 

In 1969 Papua New Guinea sent its first touring side to compete against the Mount Isa league in Queensland for a "North of Australia Championship", played three games and won two of them.

In 1969 on 8 October a touring St Kilda football team from the Victorian Football League (VFL) coached by Allan Jeans visited Port Moresby defeated a composite national PNG team at the South Pacific Oval 9-17-61 to 1-6-12 VFL great Ted Whitten, excited about the growth of the game in the highlands visited Madang; Mt Hagen; Goroka; Wewak, and Kieta in November of that year, showing locals video footage from the Richmond vs Carlton VFL Grand Final. A combined Gold Coast side toured PNG winning by a point.

Extensive growth was seen in 1970 with a new 4 team league in New Ireland established. In Morobe and the Eastern highlands in 1971 the game was booming, with the Lae league expanding to 13 teams and the Goroka league expanding in 1971 to 8 clubs.

In 1972, organised by Brian Fry, schoolboy competition began, helping boost junior player numbers.

1970s: International success
With the independence of Papua New Guinea, the opportunity presented itself for the first fully-fledged international matches in the sport. In 1973, an Indigenous Australian side selected from an Australian six-state tournament toured Papua New Guinea, led by Roger Rigney, an Indigenous player from South Australian National Football League (SANFL) club Sturt. The following year the return tour saw the PNG side captain coached by Vili Maha defeat the Indigenous Australian side at Ainslie Oval in Canberra.

VFL club South Melbourne, looking for new talent pools, expressed an interest in declaring PNG a recruitment zone. In 1973 outstanding Koboni players Vili Maha and Gimana Guma were flown to Australia to be trialled with the club, playing reserves games however they did not break into the senior side.
The following year Maha and Guma's Koboni club were brought to Australia and play against the South Melbourne Football Club reserves which they defeated soundly 14-4-104 to South Melbourne's 6-14-50.

In 1975 Port Moresby B-side defeated the visiting Royal Australian Navy team in front of a crowd of 1,000 spectators.

The first ever national side was named in 1976. and its first full international was against Nauru in Port Moresby in front of a crowd of over 10,000 at Sir Hubert Murray Stadium.

In 1977 based on the competitiveness against top VFL sides the governing body, the NFL put forward a proposal for a Papua New Guinea team to enter its knockout NFL Night Series tournament. At the time there were several leagues across the country, including Port Moresby, Goroka, Lae, Madang, Rabaul and Wewak.

1977 saw the first-ever international matches involving Australia at under 17 level between the Victoria Under 17 team (the reigning Australian Champions) and Papua New Guinea. In a historic U17 match in 1978 Papua New Guinea made a reciprocal tour and came within two goals of Australia at Football Park in Adelaide.

In October 1976, North Melbourne (VFL) toured and played against PNG at Sir Hubert Murray Stadium in front of a crowd of 8,000 spectators coached by Ron Barassi, North Melbourne won 18-12-120 to 11-10-76.
In November 1976, PNG's junior side toured Victoria and played a game against VFL club Geelong, pushing the local side, coached by Kevin Sheehan, who won by just 4 points.

Also in 1977, a visiting Gold Coast side, topped up this time with players from Victoria and Tasmania, were defeated by a Port Moresby side at Sir Hubert Murray Stadium.

In 1978 the return touring team led by captain-coach Joel Matage lost 15-11-101 narrowly to the Gold Coast home side 17-13-115 in front of a crowd of 5,000 spectators at Salk Oval.

VFL takes an interest in talent
In March 1978, following clinics by talent scout Kevin Sheehan, VFL clubs began to express increased interest in PNG's playing talent. Australian volunteer in Lae Richard Kidby in 1978 proclaimed that the rapid growth of the sport was outpacing Australia, saying it was fast becoming the most popular sport and predicted a national team would be capable of defeating a VFL team within 5 years, but lamented the lack of support and vision from Australia. Fitzroy flew William Maha and Peter Pati to train with the club and play in the reserves, North Melbourne picked David Haro and Mea Vui while Hawthorn in October flew in Ambrose Vaki and Peter Pati from Wewak as well as Port Moresby's Martin Tulungan and Tamo Vele. Kevin Sheehan, newly appointed VFL promotional officer, visited Madang; Goroka, Lae, Rabaul, Kieta, Arawa and Port Moresby on November 9.

The senior men's national team coached by Teio Ila was still on a high, thrashing a North Queensland representative side in Cairns by 61 points, leading to the Cairns matches becoming an annual event.

1980s: Australia takes control, ambitious new structure crumbles
The National Football League from Australia assumed control of PNG football operations and appointed Peter Evans as full-time manager to the PNG Rules Football Council in May 1978. Evans began a major and rapid restructure of football operations which largely ignored senior club and representative competition in favour of junior development. The PNG Rules Football Council was renamed the PNG Australian Rules Football Council and he set out to point out the ignorance of local players to the rules in an effort to eliminate any violence though the reverse occurred, with violence under the new administration dramatically increasing to a point where it was almost out of control, with several notable incidents of striking of umpires occurring and life bans instituted. The administration also banned players from national selection if their league refused to affiliate with the new administration, causing significant discontent with players outside of the national capital. The senior men's national championships were cancelled and funds diverted so that Evans, using his position as PNG National Sports Secretary, could fly a junior squad to Hobart in 1979 to participate in the Teal Cup (Australian Under 17 Championship). The team suffered humiliating defeats at the hands of the ACT, New South Wales and South Australia which was widely reported as a failure in the local media. Shortly following the tournament Evans resigned to become Tasmanian Football League chief administrator. and management of the now financially destitue administration was handed to local player William Maha. The NFL's Victorian chief John Warren visited in 1980 promising a A$100,000 injection of funds and sponsorship from Rothmans International and admission to the council though along with high expectations of the underresourced local competition for coaches, umpires and ground upgrades. Warren was openly critical of all administrators, playing style and coaches involved in the game outside of Port Moresby. PNG was, however, (unlike the Northern Territory) never admitted as a full-voting member.

With the VFL's more powerful position in national football administration and the National Football League's loss of control of the game in Australia, after 2 years of restructuring and promise, PNG was left without either an administration or funding support. With the withdrawal of the NFL and VFL from Papua New Guinea, the governing body dropped all reference to Australia in its name and reverted to the PNG Rules Football Council. To make matters worse, while rules was being banned from schools, soccer, despite not attracting an audience received more than double the funding for junior development, with Rules now attracting less than softball and netball. Rules officials lamented that while the sport in 1981 was still the third most popular in the country, having not participated in any senior international matches since 1978, its recognition as a sport at national level had all but ceased. Unlike the NFL, the VFL was occupied with the expansion its Victorian competition interstate, beginning with the relocation of the South Melbourne Football Club to Sydney. The impact was immediate and profound, with the Port Moresby League being the only league still financial and the national team severely underfunded. The "national" PNG team (consisting almost solely of Port Moresby players) travelled to the Gold Coast in 1980 where they were defeated by a representative Gold Coast team. Under overwhelming financial pressure, the PNG Rules Council was forced to cancel the National Championships for the first time leaving a gaping hole in the competition. Regional leagues were left with crippling debts threatening the future of the national championships. Soccer and rugby league were being promoted as safer options than Rules, with much lower injury rates and several provinces banned Rules from schools out of concern for student welfare due to increasing violence. The rapid decline of junior development and the focus on senior talent was lamented.  In a last ditch attempt to save the administration in 1982, members of the PNG Rules Council pushed for radical plans to move the rules season into the summer months.

The collapse of the local administration signalled the end of Rules Football in PNG for some time. The popularity of rugby league, which begun being televised in the late 1970s, particularly the New South Wales Rugby League and Rugby League State of Origin matches between Queensland and New South Wales, skyrocketed. Apart from the VFL Grand Final, Australian Rules matches during the 1980s were rarely televised. Australian government aid funding was increasingly being allocated to other sports, particularly rugby league and soccer. Players disgruntled with the collapse of the local Rules leagues switched to League in droves.  With the introduction of the Kumuls to the Rugby League World Cup in 1985 and international matches were being regularly played in Port Moresby, Rules fell out of favour. Rugby league dominated the media and Rules was virtually forgotten. A small base of dedicated but aging senior players continued to play with no officials, umpires or funding. Most of the local leagues went in and out of liquidation and were all but disbanded.

1990s: International Revival
The nearby administration body in Cairns stepped in and commencing in 1990 there was regular competition against teams from the Cairns Australian Football League.

In 1993, PNG Rules interim chairman Vili Maha led the rebranding of the national team as the "Mosquitos".

Competition in Rabaul went into hiatus in 1992, and efforts to revive the code were overshadowed by the 1994 volcanic eruption.

PNG's senior national team, the Mosquitoes, competed for the first time at the 1995 Arafura Games in Darwin, Northern Territory.  The "Mosquitos" were a success, winning the gold medal by defeating New Zealand in the Grand Final. PNG players named in the World Team named at the tournament were George Kava, Willie Lipou, Thomas Gori and Tony Megea.

In 1995, after PNG's success at the Arafura Games, Ed Biggs from the then Australian Football Foundation (AFF) and Ian Collins from the AFL visited all the major Australian football centres in PNG and had discussions with officials.

PNG Rules Football Council officials were advised to draw up a three-year development plan to qualify for football development assistance. The plan was to include a summary of the current state of Rules Football in PNG, a management structure, facilities improvement, development proposals and financial estimates.

In August 1996 the Mosquitoes travelled to Perth as part of the AFL Centenary Celebrations. They played a match against the Central Desert Eagles as a curtain-raiser to a West Coast Eagles v. Carlton match. PNG 21.22 (148) defeated the Central Desert Eagles 5.8 (38).

PNG defended their gold medal at the 1997 Arafura Games, defeating New Zealand 14.9 (93) to 9.6 (60) in the final. PNG also played against the NTFL, Australian Defence Force and Central Desert Eagles as well as their international counterparts. PNG players named in the 1997 World Team were Gibson Isaiah, George Kaore, David Lucas and Willie Lipou.

In 1999 PNG again defeated New Zealand in the final at the Arafura Games.  In the same year, a record 5,000 spectators attended the Wests vs Koboni Grand Final in Port Moresby.

2000s: Juniors Boom
In 2000 the AFL sent a Development Officer, Andrew Cadzow, to PNG. Based in Port Moresby, Cadzow also visited other regional centres.

AFL PNG was established in August 2001. AFL PNG is the representative of the AFL in PNG and has been incorporated to coordinate, support and operate Junior Development and Community-based programs relating to AFL footy in PNG. Scott Reid, Salvatore Algeri and Mel Togolo are the current Directors of AFL PNG and are responsible for establishing and promoting AFL Junior Development Programs in PNG.

PNG born Mal Michael participated in the first of three premierships with the Brisbane Lions in 2001, boosting the popularity of football enormously in the country.

In 2002, the Mosquitos finished second behind Ireland in the inaugural Australian Football International Cup.

In 2003, Alister Sioni won the AFL PNG Elite Scholarship and trained with the Brisbane Lions between 11 November and 23 December.

2005 was a big year for football in PNG.  In the International Cup, the Mosquitos finished in second place behind New Zealand.

Also in 2005, AFL Queensland took AFL PNG "under its wing" to provide a pathway for PNG players to the AFL.  Queensland is one of the nearest and most populous Australian states, and a result, there are now many junior and senior PNG players participating in Queensland state championships and clubs. Additional funding came from Queensland since, and the Mal Michael Foundation was established in the same year to further foster PNG talent.

In October 2006, the national junior Women's Footy (U16) team, the "Karakums" became the first ever female contact sport side to represent PNG.

In 2006, Papua New Guinea under 16s again won the U16s Queensland Country Championships, defeating Cairns in the Grand Final. Several PNG players were selected to represent the Country Kookaburras U16s squad which lost the Grand Final to the Northern Raiders.
Port Moresby's Stanis Susave, became the first player from Papua New Guinea to represent the Queensland Scorpions in the under 16s.

In 2007, U16 Bintangs were invited to the all-Queensland state championships, managing one win out of three by defeating the AFLQ Colts.  The U14s followed.

In November, the PNG girls Under 17 squad went through the QLD state championships undefeated to take the title outright.  Only Cape York were able to register a score against the junior Karakums.

Outstanding PNG juniors Stanis Susuve and John James were invited to the AFL/AIS Draft Camp in November 2007.

Several players to learn the game in PNG began reaching senior level in Australia in various regional and state leagues in 2007.  During the year, 13 Papua New Guinean players represented the Coolangatta-Tweed Heads AFC at senior level in Division 2 of the Queensland State League since 2000, with five playing in the senior team in 2007 - David Evertius, Donald Barry, Johnny James, Emmaus Wartovo and Ali Pinda.  Donald Barry, Elijah Baruai and Bergmann Talingapua were all recruited from PNG in 2007 to play for the Manunda Hawks in the AFL Cairns competition.

The expanding program has also seen several PNG players introduced the Sunshine Coast league including Emmanuel Tupia, John Vogae, Gary Kiele and Peter Labi in 2009.

In March 2008, John James became the first player from Papua New Guinea to represent Queensland in the Under 18 National Championships.

In September 2008, the Mosquitos took out the International Cup in a thriller against New Zealand.

In November 2008, 17-year-old Tianen Carbry was invited to the AIS/AFL academy.

In January 2009, 17-year-old Amua Parika was signed by the Gold Coast Football Club to play in the AFL. He was followed shortly after by the Gold Coast's signing of talented junior Stanis Susuve and 17-year-old Peter Labi joined the Carlton Football Club on an international scholarship.

2010s: International Success
In 2014 Papua New Guinea sent a side to the  Under-16 South Pacific Cup in Coffs Harbour, Australia in addition to taking out the senior men's International Cup in Melbourne.

Papua New Guinea won the 2017 International Cup in Melbourne.

In 2017 Hewago Oea represented Queensland U18 (he was later selected in the AFL Draft Academy), followed in Queensland representative football by 2018 by Jason Logi, Rex Peregua and Joe Yamog represented Queensland U16, followed by Glen Saniong and Benedict Baro in 2019.

In 2019, PNG fielded a club team known as the Muruks, in the Asian Australian Football Championships for the first time, which they won defeating a large number of sides featuring experienced expatriate Australian players.

National Teams

PNG's national team is the Mosquitoes.

They debuted in 1973 at Under 17 level against Australia but have not played Australia since.

In 1976, PNG defeated Nauru by 129 points in front of a crowd of over 10,000 at Sir Hubert Murray Stadium.
The team were international champions when they won the 2008 Australian Football International Cup.

The team has also tasted success in the past with a gold medal in the Arafura Games and silver at both 2002 and 2005 International Cups.

The national women's team is known as the Karakums.  They have competed in Australian provincial championships and the International Cup.

Funding & Sponsorship
Despite having the second-highest number of players and one of the highest junior participation growth rates for the sport in the world, the sport in Papua New Guinea receives one of the lowest allocations of funding from the AFL.  The international governing body provides much lower funding than South Africa despite PNG being closer and has instead insisted that AFL PNG source funds through AusAID, however this has not been forthcoming. In recent years, sponsors have helped fill the void left by a lack of AFL funding.  AFL PNG survives on Australian private donations and a small group of sponsors.

Major development funding comes from the following primary sources, including:

Leagues and Competitions

In hiatus

National Championships
The National Championships have been held since 1966. The Cleland Medal (named after Sir Donald Cleland, Australian administrator of the territories) was first awarded in 1964 is for the best and fairest player, which has at times this has been awarded across all provinces, and others for Papua or the Port Moresby League only.

¹The national titles in 2000 attracted teams from Buka, Pomio, Rabaul, Kove, Hoskins, Kimbe, Lae, Mt Hagen and National Capital District (Port Moresby).
²There were no championships staged in 2001, 2002 (due to the International Cup) or 2005 (due to the International Cup).

Governing Body
The governing body is the PNG Rules Football Council.  The development body is AFL PNG.

Audience

Television
AFL Highlights programs are shown on PNG television, including EM TV.  Live matches are broadcast on ABC Asia Pacific.

Attendance
Despite calls from Mal Michael to hold NAB Cup matches in Port Moresby, to date no AFL level matches have ever been played in PNG, however St Kilda have played against a local representative team and Australian Rules matches played there sometimes still draw big crowds. The following are notable crowds for matches played in Papua New Guinea:

Players
Papua New Guineans have played professional and semi-professional Australian rules football in Australia, and have dominated the All-International amateur team for many years.  More recently, AFL clubs have taken an interest in recruiting PNG talent. However, there are major inhibitors for recruitment, mainly height, with many of the more talented players being under 176 cm which is typically considered too short for professional AFL, strict visa entry rules that limit the amount of time that PNG nationals can develop in Australia, as well as language and cultural barriers.

Men's

Other Notable Players 
 Navu Maha - (172 cm 80 kg) Maha trained with the South Melbourne Swans VFL team in Melbourne in the 1980s.  He became captain of the Mosquitos during the 2002 and 2005 International Cups and two time All-International who has also represented Papua New Guinea in cricket.
 Marcus Bai - an Aussie Rules junior who went on to become a standout rugby league player.
 Alister Sioni - (185 cm 80 kg) a West New Britain player who won a scholarship and was invited to train with the Brisbane Lions in the pre-season of 2003, has also played in AFL Cairns seniors and was named in the 2005 All-International team. He captained the Mosquitos for the 2008 International Cup where he received a premiership medal.
 James Imbi - (180 cm) the younger brother of Winis Imbi was also born in PNG and played with Winis at Portland since 2005. After trying out with the Sturt Football Club in the South Australian National Football League in 2004, Imbi went to the Palmerston Football Club in the Northern Territory Football League where he plays in the off-season.  By round 8, 2005, Imbi had led in the ABC NTFL player of the year count with 11 votes. In 2007, like his brother, he won the Western Border Football League best and fairest.
 Jerry Frank - played 13 years for the Palmerston Football Club in the Northern Territory Football League as a defender before retiring in 2007.  Born in Port Moresby to a Papuan father and Torres Strait Islands mother he was a member of eight NT representative sides and played against a number of AFL clubs including Collingwood, Fremantle, Brisbane and also WAFL clubs.

Women's

See also

 AFL PNG
 Sport in Papua New Guinea

References

External links 
 Video of PNG National Team performing 'Ole Ole' war dance at 2005 International Cup
 Aussie Rules Expands Globally - from the PNG National

 
Sport in Papua New Guinea